Gugulethu Sophia Mbatha-Raw  (born 21 April 1983) is a British actress who is known for her performances on stage and screen. In 2017 she was appointed Member of the Order of the British Empire (MBE) by Queen Elizabeth II for services to drama. In February 2021, Mbatha-Raw was appointed a global Goodwill Ambassador for the United Nations High Commissioner for Refugees (UNHCR).

Mbatha-Raw started her career in theatre training at the National Youth Theatre and the Royal School of Dramatic Art. She  gained acclaim for her roles as Juliet in Romeo and Juliet and Octavia in Anthony and Cleopatra in 2005 at the Royal Exchange Theatre, Manchester. She made her West End and Broadway debut portraying Ophelia in Hamlet in 2009. For her role as the titular character in Jessica Swale's 2015 play Nell Gwynn earned her a nomination for the Evening Standard Theatre Award for Best Actress.

After a minor role in Larry Crowne (2011), she made her breakthrough with the British period drama Belle (2013), for which she won the BIFA Award for Best Actress. Her career progressed with roles in the films Beyond the Lights (2014), Miss Sloane (2016), Beauty and the Beast (2017), A Wrinkle in Time (2018), Motherless Brooklyn (2019), Misbehaviour (2020), and Summerland (2020).

Her early television roles include in Doctor Who (2007), and the short-lived NBC's series Undercovers (2010) and FOX's Touch (2012). She gained acclaim starring in the Netflix anthology series Black Mirror episode "San Junipero" (2016) which received the Primetime Emmy Award for Outstanding Television Movie. She's also acted in the Apple TV+ drama series The Morning Show (2019), and  the Disney+ series Loki (2021).

Early life and education 
Gugulethu Sophia Mbatha-Raw was born on 21 April 1983 in Oxford, the daughter of Patrick Mbatha, a South African doctor, and Anne Raw, an English nurse. Her father, as a student, was a member of the African National Congress and activist opposing apartheid in South Africa, having to flee as a result. Her parents separated when she was a year old, and she lived mostly with her mother.

Mbatha-Raw was educated at The Henry Box School, a state comprehensive school in the market town of Witney in Oxfordshire, where she grew up.

Interested in acting, dance, and musical theatre from a young age, Mbatha-Raw participated in the National Youth Theatre.  Her credits include dancing at the Judy Tompsett School of Dance, now known as the Marsh Tompsett School of Dance. In 2001, she moved to London to train at the Royal Academy of Dramatic Art.

Career

Early career 
Mbatha-Raw played minor roles on television series such as Bad Girls (2006) and Marple (2007). In Doctor Who she is featured as Tish Jones, the sister of companion Martha Jones, most prominently in "The Lazarus Experiment" (2007). One of her earliest breakthroughs in drama was in Romeo and Juliet at the Royal Exchange Theatre, Manchester in 2005, playing Juliet opposite Andrew Garfield as Romeo. Mbatha-Raw was nominated for best actress in the Manchester Evening News Theatre Awards for her portrayal of Juliet. She also appeared as Octavia in Antony and Cleopatra at the same theatre in 2005.

In 2009, Mbatha-Raw was cast as Ophelia in Hamlet on London's West End and Broadway, opposite Jude Law in the title role In September 2010, she was cast in J. J. Abrams' television series Undercovers after he spotted her in Hamlet. The series was cancelled two months later.

In June 2011, Mbatha-Raw was cast as the female lead on the Fox television series Touch opposite Kiefer Sutherland. She had a supporting role in the romantic comedy Larry Crowne (2011), written and directed by Tom Hanks, who starred in the title role. She was also named one of 42 Brits to Watch by the British Academy of Film and Television Arts.

2013–present 

Mbatha-Raw garnered praise starring in Amma Asante's film Belle (2013), playing the eponymous historical character, Dido Elizabeth Belle, a mixed-race woman raised as a gentlewoman in her paternal uncle Lord Chief Justice Mansfield's household in 18th-century England.

The film debuted at the 2013 Toronto International Film Festival where it was acquired by Fox Searchlight Pictures. It was released in 2014. Mbatha-Raw was nominated for numerous awards for her performance, including two British Independent Film Awards Best Performance by an Actress in a British Independent Film, which she won, and Most Promising Newcomer. She was also nominated for a Satellite Award for Best Actress. In 2014, Mbatha-Raw spoke at the United Nations headquarters when the film was screened in honor of the International Day of Remembrance of the Victims of Slavery and the Transatlantic Slave Trade.

In 2014, Mbatha-Raw also starred as a popular singer in the romantic drama Beyond the Lights. The film debuted at the 2014 Toronto International Film Festival. For her work in Beyond the Lights, Mbatha-Raw was nominated for Best Actress at the 2014 Gotham Awards.

In 2014, Mbatha-Raw was recognized by Elle Magazine during the Women in Hollywood Awards, honoring women for their outstanding achievements in film. These awards span all aspects of the motion picture industry, including acting, directing and producing.

In recognition of her body of work, Mbatha-Raw was nominated in 2015 for a BAFTA Rising Star Award. That year, she had a supporting role in the space opera Jupiter Ascending.

On 3 July 2015, it was announced that Mbatha-Raw would be the first to play the title role in Jessica Swale's Nell Gwynn playing the actress who became the mistress of King Charles II of England; it premiered at Shakespeare's Globe from 19 September to 17 October 2015. She was nominated for an Evening Standard Theatre Award for Best Actress for her performance.

Also in 2015, she appeared in the biopic Concussion, starring Will Smith. It is the story of Bennet Omalu, the forensic neuropathologist who first discovered extensive brain damage in NFL players due to concussions, and tried to put a stop to practices that contributed to the condition. She played Prema Mutiso, the wife of Bennet Omalu. The film premiered at the 2015 AFI Festival.

Mbatha-Raw starred opposite Matthew McConaughey in an American biopic on Newton Knight, a yeoman farmer, and resister of the Confederacy, in Free State of Jones (2016), directed by Gary Ross. She plays Knight's common-law wife Rachel, a freedwoman he had a family with after the Civil War.

In 2016, Mbatha-Raw appeared in "San Junipero", an episode of the anthology series Black Mirror, and played a major supporting role in Miss Sloane, a drama about Washington lobbyists, starring Jessica Chastain. The film premiered at the AFI Film Festival in November.

Gina Prince-Bythewood announced in March 2016 that Mbatha-Raw would star in her adaptation of Roxane Gay's novel An Untamed State.

Mbatha-Raw was appointed Member of the Order of the British Empire (MBE) in the 2017 Birthday Honours for services to drama.

In 2017, Mbatha-Raw played Plumette in the live-action adaptation of Beauty and the Beast, directed by Bill Condon and co-starring with Emma Watson and Dan Stevens.

In 2018, Mbatha-Raw starred in a number of science fiction feature productions, including A Wrinkle in Time, directed by Ava DuVernay, and The Cloverfield Paradox. The latter film made history that year, with a marketing campaign that saw the film's release onto the streaming platform Netflix, directly after it was advertised worldwide at the 2018 Super Bowl. Mbatha-Raw also played in an independent feature film Fast Color, which premiered worldwide at the South by Southwest Film Festival in Texas.

In February 2020, it was announced that she would play Ravonna Lexus Renslayer in the Disney+ series Loki. She was cast to star in the Apple TV+ series Surface. In addition to her starring role, she is also an executive producer on the series, which was created by Veronica West and premiered on 29 July 2022. On 2 December 2022, the series was renewed for a second season.

In 2021, Mbatha-Raw was appointed to be a global Goodwill Ambassador for the United Nations High Commissioner for Refugees (UNHCR). Since 2018, she has visited Burundian and Congolese refugees in Rwanda and Uganda as well as taken part in UNHCR's EveryOneCounts and Films of Hope campaigns. In June 2021 she helped announce the Refugee Paralympic team specifically announcing Alia Issa who will compete in the club throw. In November 2021, she was cast in the romantic film Nobody's Heart with Edgar Ramírez, directed by Isabel Coixet.

In April 2022, Mbatha-Raw was set to play the female lead in Netflix action film Lift co-starring Kevin Hart.

Personal life 
Mbatha-Raw has "always loved art", and had considered becoming an artist instead of an actor for a time. During the COVID-19 pandemic, she painted portraits of George Floyd, Breonna Taylor, and others, using painting supplies that her Concussion co-star Will Smith had given to her in 2016.

Acting credits

Film

Television

Theatre

Radio

Awards and nominations

References

External links 
 
 
 
 , originally from the Royal Academy of Dramatic Art website

1983 births
Living people
21st-century English actresses
Actresses from Oxfordshire
Alumni of RADA
Black British actresses
British Shakespearean actresses
English film actresses
English people of South African descent
English radio actresses
English stage actresses
English television actresses
English voice actresses
People from Oxford
National Youth Theatre members
Members of the Order of the British Empire
Zulu people